Jake Bobo (born August 4, 1998) is an American football wide receiver. He played college football at UCLA and Duke.

Early life and high school
Bobo grew up in Concord, Massachusetts, and attended the Belmont Hill School.  He caught 34 passes for 514 yards and five touchdowns as a senior. Bobo was rated a three-star recruit and committed to play college football at Duke over offers from Wake Forest, Boston College, and Army.

College career
Bobo began his college career at Duke. He played in all 13 of the Blue Devils' games as a freshman and caught 10 passes for 167 yards and one touchdown. Bobo missed the opening of his sophomore season with a broken collarbone. As a junior, he led Duke with 358 receiving yards on 32 receptions and scored one touchdown. Bobo caught 74 passes for 794 yards and one touchdown in 2021. After the season, Bobo entered the NCAA transfer portal.

Bobo ultimately transferred to UCLA. He caught six passes for 142 yards and two touchdowns in the Bruins' 40–32 upset win over 15th-ranked Washington. Bobo finished the season with 57 receptions for 817 yards and seven touchdowns.

References

External links
Duke Blue Devils bio
UCLA Bruins bio

Living people
Players of American football from Massachusetts
American football wide receivers
UCLA Bruins football players
Duke Blue Devils football players
1998 births